The Quantum Communications Hub is a quantum technology research hub established as part of the UK National Quantum Technologies Programme. The hub is a consortium of 8 UK universities and 13 industrial partners, which received funding of £24m over a 5-year period.

The hub will develop techniques for quantum key distribution (QKD), and in particular the chip-scale integration of QKD, as well as developing the UK's first quantum network.

Organisation 
The hub is led by the University of York and its academic partners are the University of Bristol, the University of Cambridge, Heriot-Watt University, the University of Leeds, Royal Holloway, University of London, the University of Sheffield and the University of Strathclyde.

The Quantum Communications Hub works with 13 industrial partners including Airbus, the European Telecommunication Standards Institute, ID Quantique, the UK National Physical Laboratory, and Toshiba.

References

College and university associations and consortia in the United Kingdom
Engineering and Physical Sciences Research Council
Quantum information science
Scientific research foundations